("The Great Event") is a tract in Nahuatl comprising 36 pages and was published in Mexico City, Mexico in 1649 by Luis Laso de la Vega, the vicar of the chapel of Our Lady of Guadalupe at Tepeyac outside the same city. In the preface Luis Laso de la Vega claimed authorship of the whole work, but this claim is the subject of an ongoing difference of scholarly opinion.

It is in The National Library of México.

Sections

Preface
The first section, a preface, is titled in Nahuatl "Noble Queen of Heaven, Forever Virgin, Mother of God". In it Lasso addresses the Virgin directly, and after an introduction of four to five lines proceeds to the reason why he took up Nahuatl in order to publish the history of the apparitions:
 "You yourself spoke in Nahuatl to a poor Indian and painted yourself in his , thus showing you are not displeased with many languages".
 "That the Indians of this land remember and keep in their language all you did for them and how it happened".
 "Christ on the Cross had His sentence in three languages".
 "You were with the apostles in Pentecost to receive the Holy Spirit" (a remembrance of the miracle of Diaspora Jews understanding each in his own language )

The preface ends with a short prayer in two lines pleading the Virgin's intercession for the assistance of the Holy Spirit in writing in Nahuatl.

It is probable that the Nahuatl manuscript used by Lasso was the original by Valeriano, which is presently in the New York Public Library. Most authorities, including Edmundo O'Gorman, agree on this and on the dating of its authorship, namely c. 1556.

Content, style, and structure
The , which has been described as "A Jewel of Nahuatl literature", whose beauty and depth of thought make it worthy of renown the world over, relies on the beauty of the dialogues between the Holy Virgin and St. Juan Diego to express the most tender feelings to be found in world literature.  Her promise to grant the wishes of the locals who beseech her is prominent, as is her demand for a temple on the very spot.

The  section by Valeriano of Lasso de la Vega's account is related in a poetic style, typical of the most elegant formal classical Nahuatl in its full beauty. The other parts are clearly different and with greater Spanish influence. The  is unique for presenting a blending between the deepest Nahuatl thought with the Christian message.

It is precisely on this point that a difference exists with other dialogues which invoke elements of the dramatic writings (called autos), many of which were used for the purposes of proselytization during the Spanish colonization of Mexico. Leon-Portilla suggests, "That there is in [the ] an exposition of key ideas in Christian thinking, wrapped up in the language and form conceived from the world of the Nahua. It is without a doubt that this narrative seeks to demonstrate who God and the Virgin Mary are and that their relations are of kindness and protection for human beings."

Critical response

Some contemporary scholars have written skeptical or critical texts about the origin of the image and the texts. Sousa, Poole and Lockhart, in their 1998 edition and translation, suggested that the most reasonable hypothesis was that Laso de la Vega's core narrative was based on Sánchez's earlier Image of the Virgin Mary, with an early 17th-century engraving by Samuel Stradanus as a secondary source.

The  and liberation theology
According to Cambridge professor of Mexican history David Brading, "...the romantic engagement with folk culture that characterized the revolutionary years was eventually taken up by the clergy. Equally important, the effect of the Second Vatican Council (1962–1965) and the rise of Liberation Theology was to convert the text into a potent catechetical instrument, since its emphasis on a poor peasant and his willing acceptance of the Virgin's message, not to mention [Bishop] Zumárraga's initial disdain, responded perfectly to the new-found 'option for the poor'."

Description of the image
The third section is a description of the image of the Virgin of Guadalupe as it was exhibited in the chapel of Tepeyac during Laso de la Vega's day.

""
The fourth section, called the "" (Nahuatl: "Here is an ordered account"), relates the fourteen miracles ascribed to the image of the Virgin that remained stamped on Juan Diego's  after the apparition.

Biography of Juan Diego
The fifth section is a post-apparition biography of Juan Diego, detailing his pious life and devotion to the Virgin and her image.

"Nican Tlantica"
The sixth section, the "Nican Tlantica" (Nahuatl: "Here ends"), is a general history of the Virgin in New Spain and an exhortation to her devotion.

Final prayer

Publication and authorship
There is some possibility that Laso de la Vega had collaborators in the composition of the work, but there is insufficient material evidence to demonstrate whether one or more hands were involved in the construction of the Nahuatl-language text.

The work was initially published under the auspices of Dr. Pedro de Barrientos Lomelín, vicar general of the Mexican diocese, at the press of Juan Ruiz in 1649.

In 1666, Lic. Luis Becerra Tanco (1603–1672), a secular priest, affirmed that the Nahuatl account was based on long-standing oral tradition in a deposition for the inquiries of Francisco de Siles, who was commissioned to compile documentation of the continuity of the Virgin's popular cult since the time of her apparition. Becerra Tanco later elaborated on this position in his  ("Mexico's Happiness" of 1675, claiming that Laso de la Vega's text must have been based on documents created through collaborations between the Franciscan faculty of the College of Santa Cruz Tlatelolco and their indigenous pupils shortly after the apparition itself and purported to have been in the custody of Fernando de Alva Cortés Ixtlilxochitl. He even claimed to have seen among these papers "a manuscript book written in the letters of our alphabet in an Indian's hand in which were described the four apparitions of the Most Holy Virgin to the Indian Juan Diego and his uncle Juan Bernardino."

Other scholars who have disputed Laso de la Vega's authorship include Francisco de Florencia, a Jesuit chronicler, who assumed that the "Indian manuscript" mentioned by Becerra Tanco was written by Jerónimo de Mendieta, (d. 1605), a Franciscan missionary and historian in early New Spain, and  Carlos de Sigüenza y Góngora, Florencia's censor, who, by way of correction of his charge, swore that he "found this account among the papers of Fernando de Alva. [...] The original in Mexican [Nahuatl] is of the letter of don Antonio Valeriano, an Indian, who is its true author". According to the sworn testimony of D. Carlos de Sigüenza y Góngora, the original preprint was in the calligraphy of Antonio Valeriano, its author. A very old and battered partial manuscript copy of the  comprising 16 pages and dated to c. 1556 can be found at the Public Library of New York; it has been there since 1880, together with two later copies, one of which is complete. The older copy appears in the Tonanzin Guadalupe with full historical details.

Some contemporary scholars hold the notion that Becerra Tanco, Florencia, and Sigüenza y Góngora endeavored to authenticate the events of the narrative by placing its original authorship in hands that were both native to Mexico and of greater antiquity than the mid-17th century.

Notes

References

 
 
 

1649 books
1649 in New Spain
Colonial Mexico
Virgin Mary in art
Mexican culture
Mexican folklore
Latin American folklore
Nahuatl literature
Classical Nahuatl
Catholic Church in Mexico
Our Lady of Guadalupe